Jorge Segura may refer to:

Jorge Segura (footballer) (born 1997), Colombian footballer
Jorge Segura (racewalker) (born 1975), Mexican racewalker